Dame Olivia Mary de Havilland  (July 1, 1916July 26, 2020) was a British-American actress. The major works of her cinematic career spanned from 1935 to 1988. She appeared in 49 feature films and was one of the leading actresses of her time. At the time of her death in 2020 at age 104, she was the oldest living and earliest surviving Academy Award winner and was widely considered as being the last surviving major star from the Golden Age of Hollywood cinema. Her younger sister was Oscar-winning actress Joan Fontaine.

De Havilland first came to prominence with Errol Flynn as a screen couple in adventure films such as Captain Blood (1935) and The Adventures of Robin Hood (1938). One of her best-known roles is that of Melanie Hamilton in Gone with the Wind (1939), for which she received her first of five Oscar nominations, the only one for Best Supporting Actress. De Havilland departed from ingénue roles in the 1940s and later distinguished herself for performances in Hold Back the Dawn (1941), To Each His Own (1946), The Snake Pit (1948), and The Heiress (1949), receiving nominations for Best Actress for each and winning for To Each His Own and The Heiress. She was also successful in work on stage and television. De Havilland lived in Paris from the 1950s and received honours such as the National Medal of the Arts, the Légion d'honneur, and the appointment to Dame Commander of the Order of the British Empire at the age of 101.

In addition to her film career, deHavilland continued her work in the theatre, appearing three times on Broadway, in Romeo and Juliet (1951), Candida (1952), and A Gift of Time (1962). She also worked in television, appearing in the successful miniseries Roots: The Next Generations (1979) and Anastasia: The Mystery of Anna (1986), for which she received a Primetime Emmy Award nomination and won the Golden Globe Award for Best Supporting Actress in a Television Movie or Series. During her film career, deHavilland also collected two New York Film Critics Circle Awards, the National Board of Review Award for Best Actress, and the Venice Film Festival Volpi Cup. For her contributions to the motion picture industry, she received a star on the Hollywood Walk of Fame. She and her sister remain the only siblings to have won major acting Academy Awards.

Early life
By birth, Olivia was a member of the de Havilland family, which belonged to landed gentry that originated from mainland Normandy. Her mother, Lilian Fontaine (née Ruse; 1886–1975), was educated at the Royal Academy of Dramatic Art in London and became a stage actress. Lilian also sang with the Master of the King's Music, Sir Walter Parratt, and toured the United Kingdom with the composer Ralph Vaughan Williams. Olivia's father, Walter de Havilland (1872–1968), served as an English professor at the Imperial University in Tokyo City before becoming a patent attorney. Her paternal cousin was Sir Geoffrey de Havilland (1882–1965), an aircraft designer and founder of the de Havilland aircraft company.

Lilian and Walter met in Japan in 1913 and married the following year; the marriage was not a happy one, owing in part to Walter's infidelities. Olivia Mary deHavilland was born on July 1, 1916. They moved into a large house in Tokyo City, where Lilian gave informal singing recitals. Olivia's younger sister Joan (Joan de Beauvoir de Havilland)later known as actress Joan Fontainewas born 15 months later, on October 22, 1917. Both sisters became British subjects automatically by birthright.

In February 1919, Lilian persuaded her husband to take the family back to the United Kingdom for a climate better suited to their ailing daughters. They sailed aboard the SS Siberia Maru to San Francisco, where the family stopped to treat Olivia's tonsillitis. Her father abandoned the family and returned to his Japanese housekeeper, who eventually became his second wife.

Olivia was raised to appreciate the arts, beginning with ballet lessons at the age of four and piano lessons a year later. She learned to read before she was six, and her mother, who occasionally taught drama, music, and elocution, had her recite passages from Shakespeare to strengthen her diction. During this period, her younger sister Joan first started calling her "Livvie", a nickname that would last throughout her life. DeHavilland entered Saratoga Grammar School in 1922 and did well in her studies. She enjoyed reading, writing poetry, and drawing, and once represented her grammar school in a county spelling bee, coming in second place. In 1923, Lilian had a new Tudor-style house built, where the family resided until the early 1930s. In April 1925, after her divorce was finalised, Lilian married George Milan Fontaine, a department store manager for O.A.Hale & Co. in San Jose. Fontaine was a good provider and respectable businessman, but his strict parenting style generated animosity and later rebellion in both of his new stepdaughters.

DeHavilland continued her education at Los Gatos High School near her home in Saratoga. There she excelled in oratory and field hockey and participated in school plays and the school drama club, eventually becoming the club's secretary. With plans of becoming a schoolteacher of English and speech, she also attended Notre Dame Convent in Belmont.

In 1933, a teenage deHavilland made her debut in amateur theatre in Alice in Wonderland, a production of the Saratoga Community Players based on the novel by Lewis Carroll. She also appeared in several school plays, including The Merchant of Venice and Hansel and Gretel. Her passion for drama eventually led to a confrontation with her stepfather, who forbade her from participating in further extracurricular activities. When he learned that she had won the lead role of Elizabeth Bennet in a school fund-raising production of Jane Austen's Pride and Prejudice, he told her that she had to choose between staying at home or appearing in the production and not being allowed home. Not wanting to let her school and classmates down, she left home, moving in with a family friend.

After graduating from high school in 1934, deHavilland was offered a scholarship to Mills College in Oakland to pursue her chosen career as an English teacher. She was also offered the role of Puck in the Saratoga Community Theater production of Shakespeare's A Midsummer Night's Dream. That summer, Austrian director Max Reinhardt came to California for a major new production of the same play to premiere at the Hollywood Bowl. After one of Reinhardt's assistants saw her perform in Saratoga, he offered her the second understudy position for the role of Hermia. One week before the premiere, the understudy Jean Rouverol and lead actress Gloria Stuart both left the project, leaving 18-year-old deHavilland to play Hermia. Impressed with her performance, Reinhardt offered her the part in the four-week autumn tour that followed. During that tour, Reinhardt received word that he would direct the Warner Bros. film version of his stage production, and he offered her the film role of Hermia. With her mind still set on becoming a teacher, deHavilland initially wavered, but eventually, Reinhardt and executive producer Henry Blanke persuaded her to sign a five-year contract with Warner Bros. on November 12, 1934, with a starting salary of $200 a week, marking the beginning of a professional acting career which would span more than 50 years.

Career

1935–1937: Early films 
DeHavilland made her screen debut in Reinhardt's A Midsummer Night's Dream, which was filmed at Warner Brothers
studios from December 19, 1934, to March 9, 1935. During the production, deHavilland picked up film acting techniques from the film's co-director William Dieterle and camera techniques from cinematographer Hal Mohr, who was impressed with her questions about his work. By the end of filming, she had learned the effect of lighting and camera angles on how she appeared on screen and how to find her best lighting. Following premieres in New York City and Beverly Hills, the film was released on October 30, 1935. Despite the publicity campaign, the film generated little enthusiasm with audiences. While the critical response was mixed, deHavilland's performance was praised by The San Francisco Examiner critic. In his review in the Brooklyn Daily Eagle, Winston Burdett wrote that she "acts graciously and does greater justice to Shakespeare's language than anyone else in the cast". Two minor comedies followed, Alibi Ike with Joe E. Brown and The Irish in Us (both 1935) with James Cagney. In both films, she played the sweet and charming love interesta role into which she would later become typecast. After the experience of being a Reinhardt player, deHavilland felt disappointed being assigned these routine heroine roles. In March, deHavilland and her mother moved into an apartment at the Chateau des Fleurs at 6626 Franklin Avenue in Hollywood.

Although Warner Brothers studio had assumed that the many costumed films that studios such as MGM had earlier produced would never succeed during the years of the American Great Depression, they nonetheless took a chance by producing Captain Blood (also 1935). The film is a swashbuckler action drama based on the novel by Rafael Sabatini and directed by Michael Curtiz. Captain Blood starred a then little-known contract bit-part actor and former extra, Errol Flynn, with the equally little-known de Havilland. According to film historian Tony Thomas, both actors had "classic good looks, cultured speaking voices, and a sense of distant aristocracy about them". Filmed between August 5 and October 29, 1935, Captain Blood gave deHavilland the opportunity to appear in her first costumed historical romance and adventure epic, a genre to which she was well suited, given her beauty and elegance. In the film, she played Arabella Bishop, the niece of a Jamaica plantation owner who purchases at auction an Irish physician wrongly condemned to servitude. The on-screen chemistry between deHavilland and Flynn was evident from their first scenes together, where clashes between her character's spirited hauteur and his character's playful braggadocio did not mask their mutual attraction to each other. Arabella is a feisty young woman who knows what she wants and is willing to fight for it. The bantering tone of their exchanges in the filmthe healthy give-and-take and mutual respectbecame the basis for their on-screen relationship in subsequent films. Captain Blood was released on December 28, 1935, and received good reviews and wide public appeal. DeHavilland's performance was singled out in The New York Times and Variety. The film was nominated for four Academy Awards, including Best Picture. The popular success of the film, as well as the critical response to the on-screen couple, led to seven additional collaborations: The Charge of the Light Brigade (1936), The Adventures of Robin Hood (1938), Four's a Crowd (1938), Dodge City (1939), The Private Lives of Elizabeth and Essex (1939, although de Havilland played a supporting role with Bette Davis as Flynn's leading lady), Santa Fe Trail (1940), and They Died with Their Boots On (1941).

DeHavilland appeared in Mervyn LeRoy's historical drama Anthony Adverse (1936) with Fredric March. Based on the popular novel by Hervey Allen, the film follows the adventures of an orphan raised by a Scottish merchant whose pursuit of fortune separates him from the innocent peasant girl he loves, marries, and eventually loses. DeHavilland played a peasant girl, Angela, who after being separated from her slave-trader husband becomes opera star Mademoiselle Georges, the mistress of Napoleon. The film earned six Academy Award nominations, including Best Picture. It garnered deHavilland good exposure and the opportunity to portray a character as she develops over time. Howard Barnes of the New York Herald Tribune found her later scenes as Mademoiselle Georges "not very credible", but Frank S. Nugent of The New York Times called her "a winsome Angela". That same year, she was re-united with Flynn in Michael Curtiz's period action film The Charge of the Light Brigade (also 1936), featuring Flynn look-alike Patric Knowles (playing Flynn's brother) and David Niven. The picture was set during the Crimean War and became a major box office hit.

During the film's production, deHavilland renegotiated her contract with Warner Bros. and signed a seven-year contract on April 14, 1936, with a starting weekly salary of $500. Toward the end of the year, 20-year-old deHavilland and her mother moved to 2337 Nella Vista Avenue in the Los Feliz section of Los Angeles.

DeHavilland had her first top billing in Archie Mayo's comedy Call It a Day (1937), about a middle-class English family struggling with the romantic effects of spring fever during the course of a single day. DeHavilland played daughter Catherine Hilton, who falls in love with the handsome artist hired to paint her portrait. The film did not do well at the box office and did little to advance her career. She fared better in Mayo's screwball comedy It's Love I'm After (also 1937) with Leslie Howard and Bette Davis. DeHavilland played Marcia West, a debutante and theatre fan enamoured with a Barrymore-like matinee idol who decides to help the girl's fiancé by pretending to be an abominable cad. The film received good reviews, with Variety calling it "fresh, clever, excellently directed and produced, and acted by an ensemble that clicks from start to finish" and praising deHavilland.

Also released during 1937 was another period film with deHavilland, beginning with The Great Garrick, a fictional romantic comedy about the 18th-century English actor's encounter with jealous players from the Comédie-Française who plot to embarrass him on his way to Paris. Wise to their prank, Garrick plays along with the ruse, determined to get the last laugh, even on a lovely young aristocrat, deHavilland's Germaine Dupont, whom he mistakenly believes to be one of the players. With her refined demeanour and diction, deHavilland delivers a performance that is "lighthearted and thoroughly believable", according to Judith Kass. Variety praised the film, calling it "a production of superlative workmanship". Despite the positive reviews, the film did not do as well at the box office. The Michael Curtiz-directed romantic drama Gold Is Where You Find It is a film about the late 19th-century conflict in the Sacramento Valley between gold miners and their hydraulic equipment and farmers whose land is being flooded. DeHavilland played the daughter of a farmer, Serena Ferris, who falls in love with the mining engineer responsible for the flooding portrayed by George Brent. The picture also stars Claude Rains. The film was released in February 1938, and was her first appearance in a Technicolor film but not her last. She would make three more Technicolor films within the next two years, two of which would arguably remain her most fondly remembered by audiences across the decades since their release.

1938–1940: Movie stardom 
In September 1937, deHavilland was selected by Warner Bros. studio head Jack L. Warner to play Maid Marian opposite Errol Flynn in The Adventures of Robin Hood (1938). Principal photography for this Technicolor production took place between September 26, 1937, and January 14, 1938, including location work at Bidwell Park, Busch Gardens in Pasadena, and Lake Sherwood in California. Directed by William Keighley and Michael Curtiz, the film is about the legendary Saxon knight who opposes the corrupt and brutal Prince John and his Norman lords while good King Richard is away fighting in the Third Crusade. The king's ward Maid Marian initially opposes Robin Hood, but she later supports him after learning his true intentions of helping his oppressed people.  No mere bystander to events, Marian risks her life to save Robin by providing his men with a plan for his escape. As defined by deHavilland, Marian is both a beautiful fairy-tale heroine and a spirited, intelligent woman "whose actions are governed by her mind as well as her heart", according to author Judith Kass. The Adventures of Robin Hood was released on May 14, 1938, and was an immediate critical and commercial success, earning an Academy Award nomination for Best Picture. It went on to become one of the most popular adventure films of the Classical Hollywood era.

The success of The Adventures of Robin Hood raised deHavilland's status, but this was not reflected in her subsequent film assignments at Warner Bros. Her next several roles were more routine and less challenging. In the romantic comedy Four's a Crowd (also 1938), she played Lorri Dillingwell, a flighty rich girl being romanced by a conniving public relations man looking to land an account with her eccentric grandfather. In Ray Enright's romantic comedy Hard to Get (1938), she played another frivolous rich girl, Margaret Richards, whose desire to exact revenge on a gas station attendant leads to her own comeuppance. In the summer of 1938, she portrayed the love interest between two U.S. Navy pilot brothers in Wings of the Navy, released in early 1939. While deHavilland was certainly capable of playing these kinds of characters, her personality was better suited to stronger and more dramatic roles, according to Judith Kass. By this time, deHavilland had serious doubts about her career at Warner Bros.

Some film scholars consider 1939 to be the high point of the golden age of Classic Cinema, producing award-winning, box office hits in many genres, including the Western. Warner Bros. produced Michael Curtiz's Technicolor adventure Dodge City (1939), Flynn and deHavilland's first Western film. Set during the American Civil War, the film is about a Texas trailblazer who witnesses the brutal lawlessness of Dodge City, Kansas, and becomes sheriff to clean up the town. DeHavilland played Abbie Irving, whose initial hostility towards Flynn's character Wade Hatton is transformed by events, and the two fall in loveby now a proven formula for their on-screen relationships. Curtiz's action sequences, Sol Polito's cinematography, Max Steiner's expansive film score, and perhaps the "definitive saloon brawl in movie history" all contributed to the film's success. Variety described the film as "a lusty western, packed with action". For deHavilland, playing yet one more supporting love interest in a limited role, Dodge City represented the emotional low point of her career to that point. She later said, "I was in such a depressed state that I could hardly remember my lines."

In a letter to a colleague dated November 18, 1938, film producer David O. Selznick wrote, "I would give anything if we had Olivia deHavilland under contract to us so that we could cast her as Melanie." The film he was preparing to shoot was the Technicolor epic Gone with the Wind, and Jack L. Warner was unwilling to lend her out for the project. DeHavilland had read the novel, and unlike most other actresses, who wanted the Scarlett O'Hara role, she wanted to play Melanie Hamiltona character whose quiet dignity and inner strength she understood and felt she could bring to life on the screen.

DeHavilland turned to Warner's wife Anne for help. Warner later recalled: "Olivia, who had a brain like a computer concealed behind those fawn-like eyes, simply went to my wife and they joined forces to change my mind." Warner relented, and deHavilland was signed to the project a few weeks before the start of principal photography on January 26, 1939. Set in the American South during the Civil War and Reconstruction eras, the film is about Scarlett O'Hara, the strong-willed daughter of a Georgia plantation owner in love with the husband of her sister-in-law Melanie, whose kindness stands in sharp contrast to those around her. According to film historian Tony Thomas, deHavilland's skillful and subtle performance effectively presents this character of selfless love and quiet strength in a way that keeps her vital and interesting throughout the film. Gone with the Wind had its world premiere in Atlanta, Georgia, on December 15, 1939, and was well received. Frank S. Nugent of The New York Times wrote that deHavilland's Melanie "is a gracious, dignified, tender gem of characterization", and John C. Flinn Sr. in Variety called her "a standout". The film won 10 Academy Awards, including Best Picture, and deHavilland received her first nomination for Best Supporting Actress.

Within days of completing her work in Gone with the Wind in June 1939, deHavilland returned to Warner Bros. and began filming Michael Curtiz's historical drama The Private Lives of Elizabeth and Essex (also 1939) with Bette Davis and Errol Flynn. She had hoped her work on Selznick's prestige picture would lead to first-rate roles at Warner Bros., but instead, she received third billing below the title as the queen's lady-in-waiting. In early September, she was lent out to Samuel Goldwyn Productions for Sam Wood's romantic caper film Raffles (also 1939) with David Niven, about a high-society cricketer and jewel thief. She later complained, "I had nothing to do with that style of film."

In early 1940, deHavilland refused to appear in several films assigned to her, initiating the first of her suspensions at the studio. She did agree to play in Curtis Bernhardt's musical comedy drama My Love Came Back (1940) with Jeffrey Lynn and Eddie Albert, who played a classical music student turned swing jazz bandleader. DeHavilland played violinist Amelia Cornell, whose life becomes complicated by the support of a wealthy sponsor. In his review in The New York Times, Bosley Crowther described the film as "a featherlight frolic, a rollicking roundelay of deliciously pointed nonsense", finding that deHavilland "plays the part with pace and wit".

That same year, deHavilland was re-united with Flynn in their sixth film together, Michael Curtiz's Western adventure Santa Fe Trail, set against the backdrop of abolitionist John Brown's fanatical anti-slavery attacks in the days leading up to the American Civil War. The mostly fictional story follows West Point cadets J. E. B. Stuart, played by Flynn, and George Armstrong Custer, played by Ronald Reagan, as they make their way west, both vying for the affection of deHavilland's Kit Carson Halliday. Playing Kit in a provocative, tongue-in-cheek manner, deHavilland creates a character of real substance and dimension, according to Tony Thomas. Following a world premiere on December 13, 1940, at the Lensic Theatre in Santa Fe, New Mexicoattended by cast members, reporters, the governor, and over 60,000 fans   Santa Fe Trail became one of the top-grossing films of 1940. DeHavilland, who accompanied Flynn on the well-publicised train ride to Santa Fe, did not attend the premiere, having been diagnosed with appendicitis that morning and rushed into surgery.

1941–1944: War years and lawsuit 
Following her emergency surgery, deHavilland began a long period of convalescence in a Los Angeles hospital during which time she rejected several scripts offered to her by Warner Bros., leading to another suspension. She appeared in three commercially successful films released in 1941, beginning with Raoul Walsh's romantic comedy The Strawberry Blonde with James Cagney. Set during the Gay Nineties, the story involves a man who marries an outspoken advocate for women's rights after a rival steals his glamorous "strawberry blonde" girlfriend, and later discovers he ended up with a loving and understanding wife. The film was a critical and commercial success. In Mitch Leisen's romantic drama Hold Back the Dawn with Charles Boyer for Paramount Pictures, she transitioned to a different type of role for heran ordinary, decent small-town teacher whose life and sexuality are awakened by a sophisticated European gigolo, whose own life is positively affected by her love. Leisen's careful direction and guidance appealed to deHavillandmuch more than the workman-like approach of her Warner Bros. directors. Bosley Crowther of The New York Times wrote that the actress "plays the school teacher as a woman with romantic fancies whose honesty and pride are her ownand the film'schief support. Incidentally, she is excellent." For this performance, she garnered her second Academy Award nominationthis time for Best Actress.

DeHavilland was re-united with Flynn for their eighth movie together, Raoul Walsh's epic They Died with Their Boots On. The film is loosely based on the courtship and marriage of George Armstrong Custer and Elizabeth "Libbie" Bacon. Flynn and deHavilland had a falling out the previous yearmainly over the roles she was being givenand she did not intend to work with him again. Even Flynn acknowledged, "She was sick to death of playing 'the girl' and badly wanted a few good roles to show herself and the world that she was a fine actress." After she learned from Warner that Flynn had come to his office saying he needed her in the film, deHavilland accepted. Screenwriter Lenore Coffee was brought in to add several romantic scenes and improve the overall dialogue. The result is a film that includes some of their finest work together. Their last appearance on screen is Custer's farewell to his wife. "Errol was quite sensitive", deHavilland would later remember, "I think he knew it would be the last time we worked together." Flynn's final line in that scene would hold special meaning for her: "Walking through life with you, ma'am, has been a very gracious thing." They Died with Their Boots On was released on November 21, 1941, and while some reviewers criticised the film's historical inaccuracies, most applauded the action sequences, cinematography, and acting. Thomas M. Pryor of The New York Times found deHavilland "altogether captivating". The film went on to earn $2,550,000, Warner Bros' second-biggest money-maker of that year.

DeHavilland appeared in Elliott Nugent's romantic comedy The Male Animal (1942) with Henry Fonda, about an idealistic professor fighting for academic freedom while trying to hold onto his job and his wife Ellen, portrayed by de Havilland. While her role was not particularly challenging, deHavilland's delineation of an intelligent, good-natured woman trying to resolve the unsettling circumstances of her life played a major part in the film's success, according to Tony Thomas. The film was a critical and commercial success, with Bosley Crowther of The New York Times noting that deHavilland "concocts a delightfully pliant and saucy character as the wife". Around the same time, she appeared in John Huston's drama In This Our Life (also 1942) with Bette Davis. Based on the Pulitzer Prize-winning novel of the same name by Ellen Glasgow, the story is about two sisters whose lives are destroyed by the anger and jealousy of one of the sisters. Crowther gave the film a negative review, but praised deHavilland's "warm and easy performance". During production, deHavilland and Huston began a romantic relationship that lasted three years.

According to deHavilland, one of the few truly satisfying roles she played for Warner Bros. was the title character in Norman Krasna's romantic comedy Princess O'Rourke (1943), with Robert Cummings. Filmed in July and August 1942, the story is about a European princess in New York City visiting her diplomat uncle, who is trying to find her an American husband. Intent on marrying a man of her own choosing, she boards a plane heading west and ends up falling in love with an American pilot, who is unaware of her true identity. The film was released on October 23, 1943, and did well at the box office. Bosley Crowther called it "a film which is in the best tradition of American screen comedy", and found deHavilland's performance "charming".

After fulfilling her seven-year Warner Bros. contract in 1943, deHavilland was informed that six months had been added to her contract for the times that she had been suspended. At the time, the studios had adopted the position that California law allowed them to suspend contract players for rejecting a role, and the period of suspension could be added to the contract period. Most contract players accepted this, but a few tried to challenge this assumption, including Bette Davis, who mounted an unsuccessful lawsuit against Warner Bros. in the 1930s. On August 23, 1943, acting on the advice of her lawyer Martin Gang, deHavilland filed suit against Warner Bros. in Los Angeles County Superior Court seeking declaratory judgment that she was no longer bound by her contract on the grounds that an existing section of the California Labor Code forbade an employer from enforcing a contract against an employee for longer than seven years from the date of first performance. In November 1943, the court found in deHavilland's favour, and Warner Bros. immediately appealed.

A little over a year later, the California Court of Appeal for the Second District ruled in her favour. The decision was one of the most significant and far-reaching legal rulings in Hollywood, reducing the power of the studios and extending greater creative freedom to performers. California's resulting "seven-year rule", as articulated by the Court of Appeal in analysing Labor Code Section 2855 in the De Havilland case, is still known as the De Havilland Law. Her legal victory, which cost her $13,000 in legal fees, won deHavilland the respect and admiration of her peers, among them her own sister Joan Fontaine, who later commented, "Hollywood owes Olivia a great deal." Warner Bros. reacted to deHavilland's lawsuit by circulating a letter to other studios that had the effect of a "virtual blacklisting." As a consequence, deHavilland did not work at a film studio for nearly two years.

DeHavilland became a naturalized citizen of the United States on November 28, 1941, 10 days before the United States entered World War II militarily. During the war years, she actively contributed to the war effort. In May 1942, she joined the Hollywood Victory Caravan, a three-week train tour of the country that raised money through the sale of war bonds. Later that year, she began attending events at the Hollywood Canteen, meeting and dancing with troops. In December 1943, deHavilland joined a USO tour that travelled throughout the United States and the South Pacific, visiting wounded soldiers in military hospitals. She earned the respect and admiration of the troops for visiting the isolated islands and battlefronts in the Pacific. She survived flights in damaged aircraft and a bout with viral pneumonia requiring several days' stay in one of the island barrack hospitals. She later remembered, "I loved doing the tours because it was a way I could serve my country and contribute to the war effort."

1945–1952: Vindication and recognition 

After the California Court of Appeal ruling freed her from her Warner Bros. contract, deHavilland signed a two-picture deal with Paramount Pictures. In June 1945, she began filming Mitchell Leisen's drama To Each His Own, (1946) about an unwed mother who gives up her child for adoption and then spends the rest of her life trying to undo that decision. DeHavilland insisted on bringing in Leisen as director, trusting his eye for detail, his empathy for actors, and the way he controlled sentiment in their previous collaboration, Hold Back the Dawn. The role required deHavilland to age nearly 30 years over the course of the filmfrom an innocent, small-town girl to a shrewd, ruthless businesswoman devoted to her cosmetics company. While deHavilland never formally studied acting, she did read Stanislavsky's autobiography My Life in Art and applied one of his "methods" for this role. To help her define her character during the four periods of the story, she used a different perfume for each period. She also lowered the pitch of her voice incrementally in each period until it became a mature woman's voice. Her performance earned her the Academy Award for Best Actress for 1946her first Oscar. According to film historian Tony Thomas, the award represented a vindication of her long struggle with Warner Bros. and confirmation of her abilities as an actress.

Her next two roles were challenging. In Robert Siodmak's psychological thriller The Dark Mirror (also 1946), deHavilland played twin sisters Ruth and Terry Collinsone loving and normal, the other psychotic. In addition to the technical problems of showing her as two characters interacting with each other on screen at the same time, deHavilland needed to portray two separate and psychologically opposite people. While the film was not well received by criticsVariety said the film "gets lost in a maze of psychological gadgets and speculation"deHavilland's performance was praised by Tony Thomas, who called her final scene in the film "an almost frighteningly convincing piece of acting". In his review in The Nation, James Agee wrote that "her playing is thoughtful, quiet, detailed, and well sustained, and since it is founded, as some more talented playing is not, in an unusually healthful-seeming and likable temperament, it is an undivided pleasure to see". Later that year while appearing in a summer stock production of What Every Woman Knows in Westport, Connecticut, her second professional stage appearance, deHavilland began dating Marcus Goodrich, a U.S. Navy veteran, journalist, and author of the novel Delilah (1941). The couple married on August 26, 1946.

De Havilland was praised for her performance as Virginia Cunningham in Anatole Litvak's drama The Snake Pit (1948), one of the first films to attempt a realistic portrayal of mental illness and an important exposé of the harsh conditions in state mental hospitals, according to film critic Philip French. Based on a novel by Mary Jane Ward and produced by Darryl F. Zanuck, the film is about a woman placed in a mental institution by her husband to help her recover from a nervous breakdown. Virginia Cunningham was one of the most difficult of all her film roles, requiring significant preparation both mentally and physicallyshe deliberately lost weight to help create her gaunt appearance on screen. She consulted regularly with psychiatrists hired as consultants for the film, and visited Camarillo State Mental Hospital to research her role and observe the patients. The extreme physical discomfort of the hydrotherapy and simulated electric shock therapy scenes were especially challenging for the slight  actress. In her performance, she conveyed her mental anguish by physically transforming her face with furrowed brow, wild staring eyes, and grimacing mouth.

According to author Judith Kass, deHavilland delivered a performance both "restrained and electric", portraying varied and extreme aspects of her characterfrom a shy young woman to a tormented and disorientated woman. For her performance in The Snake Pit, deHavilland received an Academy Award nomination for Best Actress, the New York Film Critics Circle Award for Best Actress, and the Venice Film Festival Volpi Cup.

DeHavilland appeared in William Wyler's period drama The Heiress (1949), the fourth in a string of critically acclaimed performances. After seeing the play on Broadway, deHavilland called Wyler and urged him to fly to New York to see what she felt would be a perfect role for her. Wyler obliged, loved the play, and with deHavilland's help arranged for Paramount to secure the film rights. Adapted for the screen by Ruth and Augustus Goetz and based on the 1880 novel Washington Square by Henry James, the film is about a naïve young woman who falls in love with a young man (Montgomery Clift), over the objections of her cruel and emotionally abusive father, who suspects the young man of being a fortune seeker. As she had done in Hold Back the Dawn, deHavilland portrayed her character's transformation from a shy, trusting innocent to a guarded, mature woman over a period of years. Her delineation of Catherine Sloper is developed through carefully crafted movements, gestures, and facial expressions that convey a submissive and inhibited young woman. Her timid voice, nervous hands, downcast eyes, and careful movements all communicate what the character is too shy to verbalise. Throughout the production, Wyler pressed deHavilland hard to elicit the requisite visual points of the character. When Catherine returns home after being jilted, the director had the actress carry a suitcase filled with heavy books up the stairs to convey the weight of Catherine's trauma physically instead of using a planned speech in the original script. The Heiress was released in October 1949 and was well received by critics. For her performance, she received the New York Film Critics Award, the Golden Globe Award, and the Academy Award for Best Actressher second Oscar.

After giving birth to her first child, Benjamin, on September 27, 1949, deHavilland took time off from making films to be with her infant son. She turned down the role of Blanche DuBois in A Streetcar Named Desire, later explaining that becoming a mother was a "transforming experience" and that she could not relate to the character. In 1950, her family moved to New York City, where she began rehearsals for a major new stage production of Shakespeare's Romeo and Juliet; it was her life-long ambition to play Juliet on the stage. The play opened at the Broadhurst Theatre on March 11, 1951, to mixed reviews, with some critics believing the 35-year-old actress was too old for the role. The play closed after 45 performances. Undaunted, deHavilland accepted the title role in the stage production of George Bernard Shaw's comedy Candida, which opened at the National Theatre on Broadway in April 1952. While reviews of the play were mixed, deHavilland's performance was well received, and following the scheduled 32 performances, she went on tour with the company and delivered 323 additional performances, many to sold-out audiences. While deHavilland achieved major accomplishments during this period of her career, her marriage to Goodrich, 18 years her senior, had grown strained because of his unstable temperament. In August 1952, she filed for divorce, which became final the following year.

1953–1962: New life in Paris 

In April 1953, at the invitation of the French government, she travelled to the Cannes Film Festival, where she met Pierre Galante, an executive editor for the French journal Paris Match. Following a long-distance courtship and the requisite nine-month residency requirement, deHavilland and Galante married on April 12, 1955, in the village of Yvoy-le-Marron, and settled together in a three-storey house near the Bois de Boulogne park in Paris' 16th Arrondissement. That same year, she returned to the screen in Terence Young's period drama That Lady (1955), about a Spanish princess and her unrequited love for King Philip II of Spain, whose respect she earned in her youth after losing an eye in a sword fight defending his honor. According to Tony Thomas, the film uses authentic Spanish locations effectively, but suffers from a convoluted plot and excessive dialogue, and while deHavilland delivered a warm and elegant performance as Ana de Mendoza, the film was disappointing. Following her appearances in the romantic melodrama Not as a Stranger (1955) and The Ambassador's Daughter (1956)neither of which were successful at the box officedeHavilland gave birth to her second child, Gisèle Galante, on July 18, 1956.

De Havilland returned to the screen in Michael Curtiz's Western drama The Proud Rebel (1958), a film about a former Confederate soldier (Alan Ladd) whose wife was killed in the war and whose son lost the ability to speak after witnessing the tragedy. DeHavilland played Linnett Moore, a tough yet feminine frontier woman who cares for the boy and comes to love his father. The movie was filmed on location in Utah, where deHavilland learned to hitch and drive a team of horses and handle a gun for her role. The Proud Rebel was released May 28, 1958, and was well received by audiences and critics. In his review for The New York Times, A. H. Weiler called the film a "truly sensitive effort" and "heartwarming drama", and praised deHavilland's ability to convey the "warmth, affection and sturdiness needed in the role".

One of deHavilland's best received performances during this period was in Guy Green's romantic drama Light in the Piazza (1962) with Rossano Brazzi. Filmed in Florence and Rome, and based on Elizabeth Spencer's novel of the same name, the film is about a middle-class American tourist on extended vacation in Italy with her beautiful 26-year-old daughter (Yvette Mimieux), who is mentally disabled as a result of a childhood accident. Faced with the prospect of her daughter falling in love with a young Italian, the mother struggles with conflicting emotions about her daughter's future. DeHavilland projects a calm maternal serenity throughout most of the film, only showing glimpses of the worried mother anxious for her child's happiness. The film was released on February 19, 1962, and was well received, with a Hollywood Reporter reviewer calling it "an uncommon love story ... told with rare delicacy and force", and Variety noting that the film "achieves the rare and delicate balance of artistic beauty, romantic substance, dramatic novelty and commercial appeal". Variety singled out deHavilland's performance as "one of great consistency and subtle projection".

In early 1962, deHavilland traveled to New York City, and began rehearsals for Garson Kanin's stage play A Gift of Time. Adapted from the autobiographical book Death of a Man by Lael Tucker Wertenbaker, the play explores the emotionally painful struggle of a housewife forced to deal with the slow death of her husband, played by Henry Fonda. The play opened at the Ethel Barrymore Theatre on Broadway to positive notices, with deHavilland receiving her best reviews as a stage actress. Theatre critic Walter Kerr praised her final scene, writing, "As darkness gathers, the actress gains in stature, taking on the simple and resolute willingness to understand." The New York World Telegram and Sun reviewer concluded: "It is Miss deHavilland who gives the play its unbroken continuity. This distinguished actress reveals Lael as a special and admirable woman." She stayed with the production for 90 performances. The year 1962 also saw the publication of deHavilland's first book, Every Frenchman Has One, a lighthearted account of her often amusing attempts to understand and adapt to French life, manners, and customs. The book sold out its first printing prior to the publication date and went on to become a bestseller.

1963–1988: Later films and television 
De Havilland appeared in her final motion picture leading roles in two films released in 1964, both of which were psychological thrillers. In Walter Grauman's Lady in a Cage, she played a wealthy poet who becomes trapped in her mansion's elevator and faces the threat of three terrorising hooligans in her own home. Critics responded negatively to the graphic violence and cruelty shown on screen. A.H. Weiler of The New York Times called it a "sordid, if suspenseful, exercise in aimless brutality". That same year, deHavilland appeared in Robert Aldrich's Hush...Hush, Sweet Charlotte with her close friend Bette Davis. After Joan Crawford left the picture owing to illness, Davis had Aldrich fly to Switzerland to persuade a reluctant deHavilland to accept the role of Miriam Deering, a cruel, conniving character hidden behind the charming façade of a polite and cultured lady. Her quiet, restrained performance provided a counterbalance to Davis. Film historian Tony Thomas described her performance as "a subtle piece of acting" that was "a vital contribution to the effectiveness of the film". The film was mainly well received and earned seven Academy Award nominations. In 1965 she served as the President of the Jury of the 18th Cannes Film Festival, the first woman to do so.

As film roles became more difficult to find, a common problem shared by many Hollywood veterans from her era, deHavilland began working in television dramas, despite her dislike of the networks' practice of breaking up story lines with commercials. Her first venture into the medium was a teleplay directed by Sam Peckinpah called Noon Wine (1966) on ABC Stage 67, a dark tragedy about a farmer's act of murder that leads to his suicide. The production and her performance as the farmer's wife Ellie were well received. In 1972, she starred in her first television film, The Screaming Woman, about a wealthy woman recovering from a nervous breakdown. In 1979, she appeared in the ABC miniseries Roots: The Next Generations in the role of Mrs. Warner, the wife of a former Confederate officer played by Henry Fonda. The miniseries was seen by an estimated 110 million peoplenearly one-third of American homes with television sets. Throughout the 1970s, deHavilland's film work was limited to smaller supporting roles and cameo appearances. Her last feature film was The Fifth Musketeer (1979). During this period, deHavilland began doing speaking engagements in cities across the United States with a talk entitled "From the City of the Stars to the City of Light", a programme of personal reminiscences about her life and career. She also attended tributes to Gone with the Wind.

In the 1980s, her television work included an Agatha Christie television film Murder Is Easy (1982), the television drama The Royal Romance of Charles and Diana (1982) in which she played the Queen Mother, and the 1986 ABC miniseries North and South, Book II. Her performance in the television film Anastasia: The Mystery of Anna (1986), as Dowager Empress Maria, earned her a Golden Globe Award for Best Supporting Actress in a Series, Miniseries or Television Film. In 1988, deHavilland appeared in the HTV romantic television drama The Woman He Loved; it was her final screen performance.

1989–2020: Retirement and honors 

In retirement, deHavilland remained active in the film community. In 1998, she travelled to New York City to help promote a special showing of Gone with the Wind. In 2003, she appeared as a presenter at the 75th Academy Awards, earning an extended standing ovation upon her entrance. In 2004, Turner Classic Movies produced a retrospective piece called Melanie Remembers in which she was interviewed for the 65th anniversary of the original release of Gone with the Wind. In June 2006, she made appearances at tributes commemorating her 90th birthday at the Academy of Motion Picture Arts and Sciences and the Los Angeles County Museum of Art.

On November 17, 2008, at the age of 92, deHavilland received the National Medal of Arts, the highest honor conferred to an individual artist on behalf of the people of the United States. The medal was presented to her by President George W. Bush, who commended her "for her persuasive and compelling skill as an actress in roles from Shakespeare's Hermia to Margaret Mitchell's Melanie. Her independence, integrity, and grace won creative freedom for herself and her fellow film actors." The following year, deHavilland narrated the documentary I Remember Better When I Paint (2009), a film about the importance of art in the treatment of Alzheimer's disease.

In 2010, de Havilland almost made her return to the big screen after a 22-year hiatus with James Ivory's planned adaptation of The Aspern Papers, but the film was never made. On September 9, 2010, deHavilland was appointed a Chevalier (knight) of the Légion d'honneur, the highest decoration in France, awarded by President Nicolas Sarkozy, who told the actress, "You honor France for having chosen us." In February the following year, she appeared at the César Awards in France, where she was greeted with a standing ovation. DeHavilland celebrated her 100th birthday on July 1, 2016.

In June 2017, two weeks before her 101st birthday, de Havilland was appointed Dame Commander of the Order of the British Empire in the 2017 Birthday Honours for services to drama by Queen Elizabeth II. She is the oldest woman ever to receive the honor. In a statement, she called it "the most gratifying of birthday presents". She did not travel to the investiture ceremony at Buckingham Palace and received her honor from the hands of the British Ambassador to France at her Paris apartment in March 2018, four months before her 102nd birthday. Her daughter Gisèle was by her side.

Personal life

Relationships
Although known as one of Hollywood's most exciting on-screen couples, deHavilland and Errol Flynn were never involved in a romantic relationship. Upon first meeting her at Warner Bros. in August 1935, 26-year-old Flynn was drawn to the 19-year-old actress with "warm brown eyes" and "extraordinary charm". In turn, deHavilland fell in love with him, but kept her feelings inside. Flynn later wrote, "By the time we made The Charge of the Light Brigade, I was sure that I was in love with her." Flynn finally professed his love on March 12, 1937, at the coronation ball for King George VI at the Ambassador Hotel in Los Angeles, where they slow danced together to "Sweet Leilani" at the hotel's Coconut Grove nightclub. "I was deeply affected by him," she later remembered, "It was impossible for me not to be." The evening ended on a sobering note, however, with deHavilland insisting that despite his separation from his wife Lili Damita, he needed to divorce her before their relationship could proceed. Flynn re-united with his wife later that year, and deHavilland never acted on her feelings for Flynn.

In July 1938, deHavilland began dating business tycoon, aviator, and filmmaker Howard Hughes, who had just completed his record-setting flight around the world in 91 hours. In addition to escorting her about town, he gave the actress her first flying lessons. She later said, "He was a rather shy man ... and yet, in a whole community where the men every day played heroes on the screen and didn't do anything heroic in life, here was this man who was a real hero."

In December 1939, she began a romantic relationship with actor James Stewart. At the request of Irene Mayer Selznick, the actor's agent asked Stewart to escort deHavilland to the New York premiere of Gone with the Wind at the Astor Theater on December 19, 1939. Over the next few days, Stewart took her to the theatre several times and to the 21 Club. They continued to see each other back in Los Angeles, where Stewart provided occasional flying lessons and romance. According to deHavilland, Stewart proposed marriage to her in 1940, but she felt that he was not ready to settle down. Their relationship ended in late 1941 when deHavilland began a romantic relationship with film director John Huston while making In This Our Life. "John was a very great love of mine", she would later admit, "He was a man I wanted to marry."

Marriages and children

On August 26, 1946, she married Marcus Goodrich, a U.S. Navy veteran, journalist, and author of the novel Delilah (1941). The marriage ended in divorce in 1953. They had one child, Benjamin Goodrich, who was born on September 27, 1949. He was diagnosed with Hodgkin's lymphoma at the age of 19 and graduated from the University of Texas. He worked as a statistical analyst for Lockheed Missiles and Space Company in Sunnyvale, California, and as an international banking representative for the Texas Commerce Bank in Houston. He died on September 29, 1991, in Paris at the age of 42 of heart disease brought on by treatments for Hodgkin's disease, three weeks before the death of his father.

On April 2, 1955, deHavilland married Pierre Galante, an executive editor for the magazine Paris Match. Her marriage to Galante prompted her relocation to Paris. The couple separated in 1962, but continued to live in the same house for another six years to raise their daughter together. Galante moved across the street and the two remained close, even after the finalisation of the divorce in 1979. She looked after him during his final bout with lung cancer prior to his death in 1998. They had one child, Gisèle Galante, who was born on July 18, 1956. After studying law at the Université de Nanterre School of Law, she worked as a journalist in France and the United States. Since 1956, deHavilland lived in a three-storey house near the Bois de Boulogne in Paris.

Religion and politics
DeHavilland was raised in the Episcopal Church and remained an Episcopalian throughout her life. In the 1970s, she became one of the first women lectors at the American Cathedral in Paris, where she was on the regular rota for Scripture readings. As recently as 2012, she was doing readings on major feast days, including Christmas and Easter. "It's a task I love", she once said. In describing her preparation for her readings, she once observed, "You have to convey the deep meaning, you see, and it has to start with your own faith. But first, I always pray. I pray before I start to prepare, as well. In fact, I would always say a prayer before shooting a scene, so this is not so different, in a way." DeHavilland preferred to use the Revised English Bible for its poetic style. She raised her son Benjamin in the Episcopal Church and her daughter Gisèle in the Roman Catholic Church, the faith of each child's father.

As a United States citizen, deHavilland became involved in politics as a way of exercising her civic responsibilities. She campaigned for Democratic President Franklin D. Roosevelt's ultimately successful reelection bid in 1944. After the war, she joined The Independent Citizens Committee of the Arts, Sciences and Professions, a national public-policy advocacy group that included Bette Davis, Gregory Peck, Groucho Marx, and Humphrey Bogart in its Hollywood chapter. In June 1946, she was asked to deliver speeches for the committee that reflected the Communist Party line, and the group was later identified as a communist front organisation. Disturbed at seeing a small group of communist members manipulating the committee, she removed the pro-communist material from her speeches and rewrote them to reflect Democratic President Harry S. Truman's anti-communist platform. She later recalled, "I realised a nucleus of people was controlling the organisation without a majority of the members of the board being aware of it. And I knew they had to be Communists."

She organised a fight to regain control of the committee from its pro-Soviet leadership, but her reform efforts failed. Her resignation from the committee triggered a wave of resignations by 11 other Hollywood figures, including future president Ronald Reagan. In 1958, she was secretly called before the House Un-American Activities Committee and recounted her experiences with the Independent Citizens' Committee.

Relationship with Joan Fontaine

De Havilland and her sister Joan Fontaine are the only siblings to have each won Academy Awards in a lead acting category. According to biographer Charles Higham, the sisters always had an uneasy relationship, starting in early childhood when Olivia had trouble accepting the idea of having a younger sister and Joan resented that her mother favoured Olivia. Olivia would tear the clothes that her sister was given to wear as hand-me-downs, forcing Joan to stitch them together again. This tension was made worse by Fontaine's frequent childhood illnesses, which led to her mother's overly protective expression "Livvie can, Joan can't." DeHavilland was the first to become an actress, and for several years Fontaine was overshadowed by her sister's accomplishments. When Mervyn LeRoy offered Fontaine a personal contract, her mother told her that Warner Bros. was "Olivia's studio" and that she could not use the family name of deHavilland.

In 1942, deHavilland and Fontaine were both nominated for an Academy Award for Best ActressdeHavilland for Hold Back the Dawn and Fontaine for Suspicion. When Fontaine's name was announced as winner, deHavilland reacted graciously saying "We've got it!" According to biographer Charles Higham, Fontaine rejected deHavilland's attempts to congratulate her, leaving deHavilland offended and embarrassed.

Their relationship was strained further in 1946 when Fontaine made negative comments to an interviewer about deHavilland's new husband Marcus Goodrich. When she read her sister's remarks, deHavilland was deeply hurt and waited for an apology that never was offered. The following year after accepting her first Academy Award for To Each His Own, deHavilland was approached backstage by Fontaine, who extended her hand to congratulate her; deHavilland turned away from her sister. The two did not speak for the next five years after the incident. This may have caused an estrangement between Fontaine and her own daughters, who maintained a covert relationship with their aunt.

Following her divorce from Goodrich, deHavilland resumed contact with her sister, visiting Fontaine's New York apartment and spending Christmas together in 1961. The final break between the sisters occurred in 1975 over disagreements regarding their mother's cancer treatment; deHavilland wanted to consult other doctors and supported exploratory surgery but Fontaine disagreed. Fontaine later claimed that deHavilland had not notified her of their mother's death while she was touring with a play, but deHavilland in fact had sent a telegram, which took two weeks to reach her sister. However, according to Fontaine in a 1979 interview with the CBC, de Havilland did not bother to phone to find out where she could be reached. The sibling feud ended with Fontaine's death on December 15, 2013. The following day, deHavilland released a statement saying that she was "shocked and saddened" by the news.

Death 
De Havilland died peacefully in her sleep of natural causes at her home in Paris on July 26, 2020, at the age of 104. Her funeral was held on August 1, 2020, at the American Cathedral in Paris. After cremation, her ashes were placed in the crematorium-columbarium of the cemetery of Père-Lachaise; the urn containing them will later be transferred to a family burial place on the British island of Guernsey in the English Channel.

Legacy

DeHavilland's career spanned 53 years, from 1935 to 1988. During that time, she appeared in 49 feature films. She began her career playing demure ingénues opposite male stars such as Errol Flynn, with whom she made her breakout film Captain Blood in 1935. They would go on to make eight more feature films together, and became one of Hollywood's most successful on-screen romantic pairings. Her range of performances included roles in most major movie genres. Following her film debut in the Shakespeare adaptation A Midsummer Night's Dream, deHavilland achieved her initial popularity in romantic comedies, such as The Great Garrick and Hard to Get, and Western adventure films, such as Dodge City and Santa Fe Trail. In her later career, she was most successful in drama films, such as In This Our Life and Light in the Piazza, and psychological dramas playing non-glamorous characters in films such as The Dark Mirror, The Snake Pit, and Hush...Hush, Sweet Charlotte.

During her career, deHavilland won two Academy Awards (To Each His Own and The Heiress), two Golden Globe Awards (The Heiress and Anastasia: The Mystery of Anna), two New York Film Critics Circle Awards (The Snake Pit and The Heiress), the National Board of Review Award, and the Venice Film Festival Volpi Cup (The Snake Pit), and a Primetime Emmy Award nomination (Anastasia: The Mystery of Anna).

For her contributions to the motion picture industry, deHavilland received a star on the Hollywood Walk of Fame at 6762 Hollywood Boulevard on February 8, 1960. Following her retirement in 1988, her lifetime contribution to the arts was honored on two continents. She received an honorary doctorate from the University of Hertfordshire in 1998 and another from Mills College in 2018. She was one of 500 stars nominated for the American Film Institute's list of 50 greatest screen legends.

In 2006, she was inducted into the Online Film & Television Association Award Film Hall of Fame.

The moving-image collection of Olivia de Havilland is held at the Academy Film Archive, which preserved a nitrate reel of a screen test for Danton, Max Reinhardt's never-produced follow-up to A Midsummer Night's Dream (1935).

De Havilland, as a confidante and friend of Bette Davis, is featured in the series Feud: Bette and Joan, portrayed by Catherine Zeta-Jones. In the series, deHavilland reflects on the origins and depth of the Davis–Crawford feud and how it affected contemporary female Hollywood stars. On June 30, 2017, a day before her 101st birthday, she filed a lawsuit against FX Networks and producer Ryan Murphy for inaccurately portraying her and using her likeness without permission. Although FX attempted to strike the suit as a strategic lawsuit against public participation, Los Angeles County Superior Court Judge Holly Kendig denied the motion in September 2017, and also granted de Havilland's request to advance the trial date (a motion for preference) and set trial for November 2017. An interlocutory appeal of Judge Kendig's ruling was argued in March 2018. A three-justice panel of the California Court of Appeal for the Second District ruled against the defamation suit brought by De Havilland (that is, by ruling the trial court erred in denying the defendants' motion to strike), in a published opinion by Justice Anne Egerton that affirmed the right of filmmakers to embellish the historical record and that such portrayals are protected by the First Amendment. De Havilland appealed the decision to the Supreme Court in September 2018, which declined to review the case.

She was also portrayed by Ashlee Lollback in the 2018 Australian biographical film In Like Flynn.

On de Havilland's death, the oldest living Academy Award winner became Eva Marie Saint, who won the award for Best Supporting Actress in On the Waterfront (1954)  and Glynis Johns, who was nominated for Best Supporting Actress in The Sundowners (1960) became the oldest living nominee.

In 2021, the Olivia de Havilland theater was inaugurated at the American University of Paris.

Awards

Honours

National Honours

Honorary degrees

Memberships and fellowships

Filmography

 Alibi Ike (1935)
 The Irish in Us (1935)
 A Midsummer Night's Dream (1935)
 Captain Blood (1935)
 Anthony Adverse (1936)
 The Charge of the Light Brigade (1936)
 Call It a Day (1937)
 The Great Garrick (1937)
 It's Love I'm After (1937)
 Gold Is Where You Find It (1938)
 The Adventures of Robin Hood (1938)
 Four's a Crowd (1938)
 Hard to Get (1938)
 Wings of the Navy (1939)
 Dodge City (1939)
 The Private Lives of Elizabeth and Essex (1939)
 Gone with the Wind (1939)
 Raffles (1939)
 My Love Came Back (1940)
 Santa Fe Trail (1940)
 The Strawberry Blonde (1941)
 Hold Back the Dawn (1941)
 They Died with Their Boots On (1941)
 The Male Animal (1942)
 In This Our Life (1942)
 Thank Your Lucky Stars (1943)
 Princess O'Rourke (1943)
 Government Girl (1944)
 To Each His Own (1946)
 Devotion (1946)
 The Well Groomed Bride (1946)
 The Dark Mirror (1946)
 The Snake Pit (1948)
 The Heiress (1949)
 My Cousin Rachel (1952)
 That Lady (1955)
 Not as a Stranger (1955)
 The Ambassador's Daughter (1956)
 The Proud Rebel (1958)
 Libel (1959)
 Light in the Piazza (1962)
 Lady in a Cage (1964)
 Hush...Hush, Sweet Charlotte (1964)
 The Adventurers (1970)
 Pope Joan (1972)
 The Screaming Woman (1972)
 Airport '77 (1977)
 The Swarm (1978)
 The Fifth Musketeer (1979)
 I Remember Better When I Paint (2009)

See also 

 List of actors with two or more Academy Awards in acting categories

Explanatory notes

References

Citations

General and cited sources

External links

 
 
 
 
 
 "Olivia de Havilland – A Century of Excellence", fair use compilation of movie clips, 6 min.

1916 births
2020 deaths
20th-century American actresses
20th-century English actresses
Actresses awarded damehoods
Actresses from Paris
Actresses from the San Francisco Bay Area
Actresses from Tokyo
American centenarians
American emigrants to France
American Episcopalians
American expatriate actresses in France
American film actresses
American people of Guernsey descent
American radio actresses
Best Actress Academy Award winners
Best Drama Actress Golden Globe (film) winners
Best Supporting Actress Golden Globe (television) winners
British people of Guernsey descent
Chevaliers of the Légion d'honneur
Dames Commander of the Order of the British Empire
Olivia
English centenarians
English emigrants to France
English emigrants to the United States
English film actresses
English radio actresses
Paramount Pictures contract players
People from Saratoga, California
People with acquired American citizenship
People with acquired French citizenship
French centenarians
United States National Medal of Arts recipients
Volpi Cup for Best Actress winners
Warner Bros. contract players
Western (genre) film actresses
Women centenarians
American anti-communists
20th-century French women
People from Los Feliz, Los Angeles
21st-century American women